Halámky is a municipality and village in Jindřichův Hradec District in the South Bohemian Region of the Czech Republic. It has about 200 inhabitants.

Etymology
The original German name Witschkoberg was probably derived from Czech Vilčkoberg, meaning "Vlček's hill". The Czech name Halámky was derived from the personal name Halama.

Geography
It lies in the Třeboň Basin. The municipality is situated on the right bank of the Lužnice, which forms the western municipal border.

History
The first written mention of Halámky is from 1783. The village was founded around 1730. The inhabitants made a living by logging, producing charcoal, making baskets and roof shingles. A special activity of the residents was the care of children from the Viennese poorhouses with the financial support of the city of Vienna.

Transport
The I/24 road (part of European route E49) passes through the municipality.

Sights
A technical monument is the bridge over the Lužnice.

References

External links

Villages in Jindřichův Hradec District